Against Perfection is the debut album by the British alternative rock band Adorable. It was released in 1993 on Creation Records. The band supported the album with a North American tour.

"Still Life" was recorded without the inclusion of drums. "Sunshine Smile" was a college radio hit.

Critical reception

The Washington Post wrote that the album "sometimes balances the harsh and the lyrical in the manner of My Bloody Valentine, but ultimately seems more indebted to the minor-key epics of early Echo and the Bunnymen." The Waterloo Region Record noted that "all twelve songs on this release sound pretty much the same, with Piotr Fijalkowski's very power-wave British vocals set against guitars that threaten to jangle but usually just screech." Trouser Press praised the "sharp, varied songs that are by turns pretty, soaring and brooding."

In 2016, Pitchfork ranked Against Perfection at number 42 on its list of "The 50 Best Shoegaze Albums of All Time".

Track listing
UK version
"Glorious" – 4:17
"Favourite Fallen Idol" – 2:41
"A to Fade In" – 4:50
"I Know You Too Well" – 3:41
"Homeboy" – 4:30
"Sistine Chapel Ceiling" – 3:34
"Cut #2" – 4:43
"Crash Sight" – 4:02
"Still Life" – 2:37
"Breathless" – 5:18

US version
"Sunshine Smile" – 5:03
"Glorious" – 4:17
"Favourite Fallen Idol" – 2:41
"A to Fade In" – 4:50
"I Know You Too Well" – 3:41
"Homeboy" – 4:30
"Sistine Chapel Ceiling" – 3:34
"Cut #2" – 4:43
"Crash Sight" – 4:02
"Still Life" – 2:37
"Breathless" – 5:18
"I'll Be Your Saint" – 3:32

Japan version
"Glorious" – 4:17
"Favourite Fallen Idol" – 2:41
"A to Fade In" – 4:50
"I Know You Too Well" – 3:41
"Homeboy" – 4:30
"Sistine Chapel Ceiling" – 3:34
"Cut #2" – 4:43
"Crash Sight" – 4:02
"Still Life" – 2:37
"Breathless" – 5:18
"Sunshine Smile" – 5:03
"I'll Be Your Saint" – 3:32
"Summerside" – 2:49

Personnel
Piotr Fijalkowski – vocals, guitar
Robert Dillam – guitar
Stephen "Wil" Williams – bass
Kevin Gritton – drums

Charts

References

1993 debut albums
Creation Records albums
Adorable (band) albums
Albums produced by Alan Moulder